Katt Both (1905–1985) was a German photographer, furniture designer and architect.

Both studied furniture design at the Bauhaus from 1924 to 1928, under László Moholy-Nagy. Following this she worked for the brothers Hans and Wassili Luckhardt in Berlin. In March 1929 Otto Haesler in Celle hired her, where she was the first woman architect. Her work is included in the collections of the Getty Museum, the Art Gallery of New South Wales, the Minneapolis Institute of Art.

Gallery

References

Further reading
Corinna Isabel Bauer: Bauhaus and Tessenow students . Kassel University Library, Kassel 2010, p. 330–332 ( d-nb.info - dissertation, completed in 2003).
Patrick Rössler , Elizabeth Otto : Women at the Bauhaus. Pioneering modern artists . Knesebeck, Munich 2019, ISBN 978-3-95728-230-9 , pp. 88-89.
Ute Maasberg, Regina Prinz: The new ones are coming! Female avant-garde in the architecture of the twenties . Junius, Hamburg 2004, ISBN 3-88506-550-9 , p. 73-78 .
Simone Oelker: Otto Haesler. A career as an architect in the Weimar Republic . Dölling and Galitz, Hamburg 2002, ISBN 3-935549-15-6 , pp. 316-317 .
Renate Petzinger, Christine Jachmann: Contemporary witnesses . In: Union internat. Des femmes architectes, Section Federal Republic e. V. (Ed.): Architectural History. *Catalog. On the history of women architects and designers in the 20th century; a 1st compilation . Berlin 1987, p. 47–48 (contains interview with Katt Both).

1905 births
1985 deaths
20th-century German photographers
21st-century German photographers
20th-century German women artists
21st-century German women artists